The 1993 Miller Lite Hall of Fame Tennis Championships, was a men's tennis tournament played on outdoor grass courts at the Newport Casino  in Newport, Rhode Island, United States that was part of the World Series of the 1993 ATP Tour. It was the 20th edition of the tournament and was held from July 5 through July 11, 1993. Unseeded Greg Rusedski won the singles title.

Finals

Singles
 Greg Rusedski defeated  Javier Frana 7–5, 6–7(7–9), 7–6(7–5)
 It was Rusedski's 1st singles title of his career.

Doubles
 Javier Frana /  Christo van Rensburg defeated  Byron Black /  Jim Pugh 4–6, 6–1, 7–6

References

External links
 ITF tournament edition details

Hall of Fame Tennis Championships
Hall of Fame Open
Hall of Fame Tennis Championships
Hall of Fame Tennis Championships
Hall of Fame Tennis Championships